Dalmacio Negro Pavón (born December 23, 1931 in Madrid) is a Spanish university professor and author, member of the Spanish Royal Academy of Moral and Social Sciences.

He is an attorney at law and holds an MA in philosophy and a PhD in political science. Former positions include: associate professor of "Foundations in Philosophy", associate professor of "Philosophy in History" and professor of "History of ideas and Political Forms" at Universidad Complutense in Madrid, Spain.

At the moment he is emeritus professor of political science at CEU San Pablo University in Madrid (Spain) wherein he is actively engaged in the teaching of the degree in political science and public administration. He is also chairman of an advanced political science and history of ideas seminar that meets once a week.

Selected bibliography
A selected bibliography of Prof. Dalmacio Negro's books in Spanish (at the moment there are no English translations), sorted by year of first publication:
 1976. Liberalismo y Socialismo: La encrucijada intelectual de Stuart Mill. Madrid: Centro de Estudios Políticos y Constitucionales. .
 1985. Compte: Positivismo y Revolución. Editorial Cincel. .
 1988. El Liberalismo en España. Unión Editorial, Madrid. .
 1995. Estudios sobre Carl Schmitt. Fundación Cánovas del Castillo, Madrid. . 
 1995. La Tradición Liberal y el Estado. Unión Eitorial, Madrid. .
 2002. Gobierno y Estado. Marcial Pons, Madrid. .
 2006. Lo que Europa debe al Cristianismo. Unión Editorial, Madrid. .
 2008. El Mito del Hombre Nuevo. Ediciones Encuentro, Madrid. . 
 2010. Historia de las Formas del estado. Ediciones Encuentro, Madrid. .

References

External links
 Papers by Dalmacio Negro kept at Fundación Burke, Madrid
 Dalmacio Negro Pavón “La primera condición: la existencia de demócratas”
 “RACMYP website”
 Website of the Political Studies Seminar "Luis Diez del Corral"

1931 births
20th-century Spanish philosophers
21st-century Spanish philosophers
Historians of philosophy
Living people
Spanish political scientists